A Master of Science in Quality Management and Analytics  (abbreviated QMA or MSQMA) is a postgraduate academic master’s degree in Quality Management and Analytics, also known as M.S. in QM and Analytics.

Candidates of M.S. in Quality Management and Analytics are required to have at least a bachelor's degree from an accredited university. Most programs require 33-39 graduate credits and a thesis or final project. Programs vary in content, though most curricula are designed to help students to think analytically and develop creative problem solving skills as well as enabling graduates to address complex real-world analytical problems in a wide variety of fields.

Curriculum Structure
The Master of Science in QM and Analytics is a three to four semesters Master’s Degree that is designed to prepare students to use data-driven methods to contribute to organizational effectiveness and to help guide decisions.

Key topics may include decision making, optimization and simulation methods, predictive modeling, and multivariate statistics. Teamwork, written and oral communication, presentation and other skills that are crucial for students to prepare themselves for a professional career are also addressed throughout the curriculum.

Institutions with MS in Quality Management and Analytics Degree Programs

Here is a list of institutions that have a Master of Science in Quality Management and Analytics or quality and analytics related programs in the U.S.:
Illinois State University –  MS in Quality Management and Analytics
Indian Statistical Institute - MS in Quality Management Science
Florida Institute of Technology –  MS in Quality Management
The National Graduate School of Quality Management at New England College of Business – MS in Quality Systems Management
University of Chicago – MS in Analytics
Arizona State University – MS in Business Analytics
University of Connecticut – MS in Business Analytics and Project Management
Fairfield University – MS in Business Analytics
Bentley University – MS in Business Analytics

Careers in Quality Management and Analytics
Government, industry and non-profit organizations across the globe are collecting and analyzing data to create a business advantage across markets and industries, and that trend is expected to grow exponentially. The M.S. in QM and Analytics is designed to prepare students to pursue a variety of QM and/or Analytics careers such as Quality Manager, Quality Analyst, Data Analyst, Business Analyst, Quality Consultant, and Quality Systems specialist, or to pursue doctoral-level graduate studies in preparation for research and instructional roles in quality management and/or analytics.

See also 
 List of master's degrees
 American Society for Quality
 Top Big Data & Analytics Masters Programs
 Quality Management System
 Six Sigma

References

Master's degrees